The Veydelevka steppe is an area of remnant steppe vegetation in Veydelevsky District, Belgorod Oblast in Russia. Together with a small tract of adjacent forest, it forms part of the Gniloye conservation area.

Most of the reserve is covered in feather grass steppe dominated by Stipa tirsa. It contains a number of endangered plant species, including Bulbocodium versicolor, Iris humilis, Stipa pennata, Matthiola fragrans and Hedysarum grandiflorum. There are also a fairly large number of Paeonia tenuifolia'', a symbol of Veydelevsky District that is depicted on its coat of arms.

References

Protected areas of Russia